The Barretts Tunnels are a pair of railroad tunnels in St. Louis County, Missouri, the first ones built west of the Mississippi River. They were built by the Pacific Railroad in 1853.

The tunnels were added to the National Register of Historic Places in 1977.

See also
National Register of Historic Places listings in St. Louis County, Missouri
List of bridges on the National Register of Historic Places in Missouri

External links
Site and locator map 
Archive version of Site and locator map

Notes

Railway tunnels in Missouri
National Register of Historic Places in St. Louis County, Missouri
Historic districts in Missouri